Černuc is a municipality and village in Kladno District in the Central Bohemian Region of the Czech Republic. It has about 1,000 inhabitants.

Administrative parts
Villages of Bratkovice, Miletice and Nabdín are administrative parts of Černuc.

References

Villages in Kladno District